The Man Who Planted Trees is a 1987 Canadian short animated film directed by Frédéric Back. It is based on Jean Giono's 1953 short story The Man Who Planted Trees. This 30-minute film was distributed in two versions, French and English, narrated respectively by actors Philippe Noiret and Christopher Plummer, and produced by Radio-Canada.

Awards
The film won the Academy Award (1988) for Best Animated Short Film. It also competed for the Short Film Palme d'Or at the 1987 Cannes Film Festival. The film won the Golden Sheaf Award for Best Animation at the 1988 Yorkton Film Festival.

In 1994, it was voted number 44 of the 50 Greatest Cartoons of all time by members of the animation field.

References

Further reading
Olivier Cotte (2007) Secrets of Oscar-winning animation: Behind the scenes of 13 classic short animations. (Making of '"The Man Who Planted Trees") Focal Press.

External links

1987 films
1987 animated films
1980s animated short films
Best Animated Short Academy Award winners
Canadian animated short films
Environmental films
Films scored by Normand Roger
Films based on short fiction
Films based on works by Jean Giono
Films directed by Frédéric Back
Films set in 1913
Films set in 1920
Films set in 1933
Films set in 1935
Films set in 1939
Films set in 1945
Films set in 1947
Films about trees
1980s French-language films
Ici Radio-Canada Télé original programming
1980s Canadian films